Wakara may refer to:

Walkara, Shoshone chief
Wakara people, or Wakura, Australia
Wakara language, or Kuku Wakura